If I Were a Congressman (Spanish: Si yo fuera diputado) is a 1952 Mexican comedy film directed by Miguel M. Delgado and starring Cantinflas, Gloria Mange and Andrés Soler.

The film's art direction was by Gunther Gerszo.

Plot
A poor but honest barber becomes the protector of the poor people in his neighborhood, which leads to him being sought as a candidate for congressman, since the other candidate, Don Próculo, is not accepted by anyone other than his own bodyguards.

Cast
 Cantinflas as Cantinflas  
 Gloria Mange as Sarita  
 Andrés Soler as Tío Juan  
 Emperatriz Carvajal as Lucía  
 Alejandro Ciangherotti as Juliano Fraschetti  
 Ernesto Finance as Don Proculo L. de Guevara  
 Rafael Icardo as Don Melquiades  
 Eduardo Alcaraz as Doctor  
 María Cristina Lesser as La acusada  
 Edmundo Espino 
 Armando Velasco as Agente ministerio público
 Gregorio Acosta as Empleado del teatro (uncredited)
 Ricardo Adalid as Empleado del teatro (uncredited)
 Víctor Alcocer as Martín Sánchez (uncredited)
 Armando Arriola as Abogado en derecho (uncredited)
 Daniel Arroyo as Miembro del jurado (uncredited)
 Stephen Berne as Espectador (uncredited)
 Lupe Carriles as Mujer de vecindad (uncredited)
 Alberto Catalá as Señor González (uncredited)
 Pedro Elviro as Amigo del barbero (uncredited)
 José Escanero as Amigo del barbero (uncredited)
 Jesús Gómez as Policía (uncredited)
 Regino Herrera as Cargador (uncredited)
 Carmen Manzano as Madre de la pelona (uncredited)
 Roberto Meyer as Comisario (uncredited)
 Bruno Márquez as Violinista (uncredited)
 José Ortiz de Zárate as Juez (no acreditaddo)
 José Pardavé as Cliente de Cantinflas (uncredited)
 Ignacio Peón (uncredited)
 Salvador Quiroz as Farmacéutico (uncredited)
 Humberto Rodríguez as Don Remigio (uncredited)
 Félix Samper as Cliente de Sarita (uncredited)
 Alfredo Varela padre as Amigo del barbero (uncredited)

References

Bibliography 
 Eric Zolov. Iconic Mexico: An Encyclopedia from Acapulco to Zócalo. ABC-CLIO, 2015.

External links 
 

1952 films
1952 comedy films
Mexican comedy films
1950s Spanish-language films
Films directed by Miguel M. Delgado
Mexican black-and-white films
1950s Mexican films